Solomon Etting (28 July 1764 – 6 August 1847) was a Jewish merchant and politician in Baltimore, Maryland. Before moving to Baltimore in 1791, Etting lived in York and Lancaster, Pennsylvania.

Maryland banned non-Christians from holding office or practicing law. In 1797, Etting and his father-in-law Bernard Gratz petitioned to “be placed upon the same footing with other good citizens" but were unsuccessful then, as well as in 1802 and 1824. Another partner in the fight was Baltimore banker Jacob I. Cohen Jr.

Etting followed another Jewish immigrant, Jacob Henry, in the endeavor to attain public office.  North Carolina denied public office to all non-Protestants, when in 1809, Henry made a speech which became famous, asserting his inalienable right to sit in the state's House of Commons, and the House took his part.  Henry asked, "Will you drive from your shores and from the shelter of your constitution all who do not lay their oblations on the same altar, observe the same ritual, and subscribe to the same dogmas? If so, which among the various sects into which we are divided shall be the favored one?"

Around 1820, there were about 4,000 Jews in the United States; only seven of the original 13 states recognized them politically.

In 1826, the "Jew Bill" finally passed, allowing members of the Jewish faith to hold public office upon swearing to a belief in "the doctrine of reward and punishment" rather than the generally required declaration of belief in Christianity. Etting was then elected to the Baltimore City Council. At that time, the American Jewish population numbered 6,000.

Solomon was one of eight children born to Shinah Solomon Etting and her husband Elijah Etting.

References

External links 
 Etting Cemetery – Explore Baltimore Heritage

1764 births
1847 deaths
18th-century American businesspeople
19th-century American businesspeople
American merchants
American people of German-Jewish descent
Baltimore City Council members
Jewish American people in Maryland politics
Jews and Judaism in Baltimore
People from York, Pennsylvania
People from Lancaster, Pennsylvania
Politicians from Baltimore